The Seret is a minor river in Ukraine, a tributary of the Tysmenytsia (Dniester basin). The Seret flows through the center of Drohobych, a city located in Lviv Oblast in the west of Ukraine.

The river flows from a lake in the forested Ivano-Frankivsk Oblast and is very polluted with a distinct smell. Of all species only microorganisms and domestic ducks can tolerate the water and the river's condition is currently a subject of the biological research.

The town's main park and the city hall are located along the river.

Rivers of Lviv Oblast
Tributaries of the Dniester